Mound Valley is a city in Labette County, Kansas, United States.  As of the 2020 census, the population of the city was 348.

History
Mound Valley was founded in 1869. It was named from mound-like hills in the vicinity.

The first post office in Mound Valley was established in May 1870. Mound Valley was incorporated as a city in 1871.  The town was a stop on the Missouri-Kansas-Texas railroad line from the 1886 to the 1970s.

Geography
Mound Valley is located at  (37.206173, -95.404231).

Climate
The climate in this area is characterized by hot, humid summers and generally mild to cool winters.  According to the Köppen Climate Classification system, Mound Valley has a humid subtropical climate, abbreviated "Cfa" on climate maps.

Demographics

2010 census
As of the census of 2010, there were 407 people, 170 households, and 105 families residing in the city. The racial makeup of the city was 92.9% White, 2.2% Native American, 0.7% from other races, and 4.2% from two or more races. Hispanic or Latino of any race were 2.2% of the population.

There were 170 households, of which 28.2% had children under the age of 18 living with them, 43.5% were married couples living together, 13.5% had a female householder with no husband present, 4.7% had a male householder with no wife present, and 38.2% were non-families. 32.4% of all households were made up of individuals, and 14.1% had someone living alone who was 65 years of age or older. The average household size was 2.39 and the average family size was 2.99.

The median age in the city was 40.8 years. 25.1% of residents were under the age of 18; 6.4% were between the ages of 18 and 24; 22.9% were from 25 to 44; 28% were from 45 to 64; and 17.7% were 65 years of age or older. The gender makeup of the city was 49.9% male and 50.1% female.

2000 census
As of the census of 2000, there were 418 people, 168 households, and 115 families residing in the city. The racial makeup of the city was 94.26% White, 2.15% Native American, 1.67% from other races, and 1.91% from two or more races. Hispanic or Latino of any race were 1.91% of the population.

There were 168 households, out of which 35.1% had children under the age of 18 living with them, 52.4% were married couples living together, 11.9% had a female householder with no husband present, and 31.5% were non-families. 30.4% of all households were made up of individuals, and 16.7% had someone living alone who was 65 years of age or older. The average household size was 2.49 and the average family size was 3.05.

In the city, the population was spread out, with 27.5% under the age of 18, 10.5% from 18 to 24, 27.3% from 25 to 44, 21.5% from 45 to 64, and 13.2% who were 65 years of age or older. The median age was 36 years. For every 100 females, there were 85.8 males. For every 100 females age 18 and over, there were 83.6 males.

The median income for a household in the city was $23,542, and the median income for a family was $35,481. Males had a median income of $21,488 versus $13,958 for females. The per capita income for the city was $11,252. About 21.5% of families and 24.1% of the population were below the poverty line, including 29.3% of those under age 18 and 8.2% of those age 65 or over.

Education
The community is served by Labette County USD 506 public school district.

Notable people
 George Pepperdine, philanthropist, founder of Pepperdine University and Western Auto
 James Wesley, country music singer

See also
 Big Hill Lake

References

Further reading

External links
 City of Mound Valley
 Mound Valley - Directory of Public Officials
 Mound Valley city map, KDOT

Cities in Kansas
Cities in Labette County, Kansas